Pridvorica (Serbian Cyrillic ) is a village in Serbia situated in the municipality of Čačak and the district of Moravica.  In 2002, it had 208 inhabitants, all Serbs.

In 1948, the village had 236 inhabitants, in 1981 140 and, in 1991, 243.

References

External links
 Satellite view of Pridvorica

Populated places in Moravica District